Riti Pathak (born 1 July 1977) is a member of the Lower House of Parliament in India from Sidhi in Madhya Pradesh who belongs to Bharatiya Janata Party. She was first elected to the Lok Sabha in the 2014 Lok Sabha elections as a candidate of the Bharatiya Janata Party from Sidhi seat of Madhya Pradesh, and won seat by defeating the INC candidate by a margin of 1,08,046 votes. She was re-elected to the 17th Loksabha in 2019. She won the Sidhi seat again by defeating the Congress candidate Shri Ajay Singh by a margin of 2,86,520 votes.

Early life, education, and personal life

Riti Pathak (born Riti Pandey) was born on 1 July 1977 in Village Khatkhari of District Sidhi, Madhya Pradesh (present-day District Singrauli, Madhya Pradesh) to Smt. Shyama Pandey (Homemaker) and Shri Ramkaran Dev Pandey (Lawyer).

She was brought up in Rewa. She did her bachelor's degree (BA) in history and Hindi literature followed by master's degree in history (from Girls Degree College, Rewa). Then she completed her graduation in LLB(The Bachelor of Laws).

While in School and college she was also active in co-curricular activities and completed her all three NCC certificates by her graduation. She was Joint Secretary at GDC in 1994-95

In the year 1997, she married Shri Rajneesh Pathak.

M.A From Avdhesh Pratap Singh university, Rewa in 1999, 
L.L.B From Avdhesh Pratap Singh University Rewa in 2002

Social work and politics

With inspiration and support from her family, she started social works for women in her home constituency area. She was introduced to Politics when she contested for Jila Panchayat Adhyaksh, Sidhi and won. In 2014, she contested the election from constituency Sidhi of Madhya Pradesh and won by the margin of 1,08,046 votes. She was re-elected to the Loksabha in 2019. She is currently a sitting member of 17th Loksabha.

Positions held

Member, Standing Committee on Coal and Steel (1 September 2014 - 25 May 2019)
Member, Consultative Committee, Ministry of Rural Development, Panchayati Raj & Drinking Water Sanistation.(1 September 2014 - 25 May 2019)
Member, Committee on Empowerment of Women (5 February 2015 - 25 May 2019)
Member, Committee on Public Accounts (1 May 2016 - 25 May 2019) 
 Zila Panchayat Adhyaksh, 2010 to 2014

References

External links
 

Living people
1978 births
People from Sidhi district
India MPs 2014–2019
India MPs 2019–present
Women in Madhya Pradesh politics
Lok Sabha members from Madhya Pradesh
Bharatiya Janata Party politicians from Madhya Pradesh
21st-century Indian women politicians
21st-century Indian politicians
Madhya Pradesh district councillors